The Sensual Man (also known as The Sensuous Sicilian) is a 1974 Italian comedy film written and directed by Marco Vicario.

It is loosely based on the novel of the same name written by Vitaliano Brancati. It was shot in Catania, Sicily and in Rome.

Plot
A Sicilian baron, Paolo Castorini has spent his life (beginning before puberty) dealing with girls, and later, women, usually in matters of the flesh.  But later in life he begins to search for a deeper meaning to life.  When his father is brought to his deathbed, Paolo (after making a pass at the dying man's nurse) is surprised to learn that the apparently staid, upright father had been unfaithful as a young man, as also Paolo's grandfather, and that such unfaithfulness had brought consequences both moral and medical.

Cast
Giancarlo Giannini: Paolo Castorini
Rossana Podestà: Lilia
Riccardo Cucciolla: Paolo's father
Lionel Stander: Paolo's Grandfather, Baron Castorini
Gastone Moschin: Uncle Edmondo
Adriana Asti: Beatrice
Marianne Comtell: Paolo's mother
Vittorio Caprioli: Salvatore, the pharmacist
Ornella Muti: Giovanna
Barbara Bach: Anna
Neda Arnerić: Caterina, Paolo's wife
Dori Dorika: Paolo's sister
Pilar Velázquez: Ester
Femi Benussi: Prostitute in red
Umberto D'Orsi: The Marquis
Orchidea de Santis: Prostitute with fur coat
Oreste Lionello: Painter
Mario Pisu: Lorenzo Banchieri
Attilio Dottesio: Doctor Mondella
Eugene Walter: Jacomini

Release and reception
The movie, of 1:48 hr running time, was released and circulated in Italy, and also played in US arthouses under the title Paolo il Caldo.  Then in 1977 it was re-released for the English-speaking public under the title The Sensual Man, with English subtitles.  It received a US MPAA film rating of "R".

References

External links
 

1974 films
1974 comedy films
Italian comedy films
Films based on Italian novels
Films set in Sicily
Films shot in Rome
Films scored by Armando Trovajoli
Films directed by Marco Vicario
1970s Italian films